The European Astrobiology Network Association (EANA) coordinates and facilities research expertise in astrobiology in Europe.

EANA was created in 2001 to coordinate the different European centers in astrobiology and the related fields previously organized in paleontology, geology, atmospheric physics, planetary science and stellar physics. 

The association is administered by an Executive Council that is elected every three years and represents the European nations active in the field, as Austria, Belgium, France, Germany, Italy, Portugal, Spain, etc. 
The EANA Executive Council is composed of a president, two vice-presidents, a treasurer and two secretaries, and councillors. Further information about the current Executive Council can be founded at http://www.eana-net.eu/index.php?page=Discover/eananetwork.

The EANA association strongly supports the AbGradE – Astrobiology Graduates in Europe, which is an independent organisation that aim to support early-career scientists and students in astrobiology.

Objectives

The specific objectives of EANA are to:
bring together active European researchers and link their research programs
fund exchange visits between laboratories
optimize the sharing of information and resources facilities for research
promote this field of research to European funding agencies and politicians
promote research on extremophiles of relevance to environmental issues in Europe
interface with the Research Network with European bodies (e.g. European Space Agency, and the European Commission)
attract young scientists to participate 
promote public interest in astrobiology, and to educate the younger generation

References

External links
 European Astrobiology Network Association (EANA) - home page

Astrobiology
Biology societies
Space organizations
Scientific organizations established in 2001